This is a list of the human spaceflight missions conducted by the Soviet space programme.  These missions belong to the Vostok, Voskhod, and Soyuz space programs.

The first patch from the Soviet Space Program was worn by Valentina Tereshkova, then the same patch for the Voskhod 2, Soyuz 4/5 and Soyuz 11, Soyuz 3 had an official insignia that wasn't worn during the flight and then in the Apollo–Soyuz program. After that and until Soyuz TM-12 "Juno" flight mission patches had been designed only for international missions.

Vostok program

Voskhod program

Soyuz program

First Soyuz missions to Salyut 1 (1967–1971)

1973–1977

Salyut 6 to Salut 7 (1977–1986)

Crewed Soyuz-TM Mir missions (1987–1991)

For subsequent Soyuz missions conducted by the Russian Federal Space Agency, see List of Russian human spaceflight missions.

Notes
1 Commercially funded cosmonaut or other "spaceflight participant".

See also
List of Progress flights, with all flights of the Progress resupply craft that is based on the Soyuz spacecraft

References

Human spaceflight programs
Soviet human spaceflight missions
Vostok program
Voskhod program
Soyuz program

Soviet